Jiujiang Town is a town in Nanhai District, Foshan, Guangdong, Southern China. It is an important production base for clothing, electronics, packaging and rice wine in Foshan. It connects with Heshan by the famous Jiujiang Bridge across the Xi River.

See also
Jiujiang dialect

References

External links
Official website of Jiujiang Town, Nanhai District (Chinese)

Nanhai District
Towns in Guangdong